James Bowie High School, also known as Bowie High School, is a public high school located in Simms, Texas (United States). It is the sole high school in the Simms Independent School District and is classified as a 2A school by the UIL. In 2015, the school was rated "Met Standard" by the Texas Education Agency.

Athletics
The Bowie Pirates compete in the following sports:

Baseball
Basketball
Cross Country
Football
Golf
Powerlifting
Softball
Tennis
Track and Field
Volleyball

References

External links
 Official website

Schools in Bowie County, Texas
Public high schools in Texas